Thelymitra crinita, commonly known as the blue lady orchid, queen orchid or lily orchid, is a species of orchid which is endemic to the south-west of Western Australia. It has a single broad, oval leaf and up to fifteen brilliant blue flowers with a blue column with the lobe on top of the anther covered with short, finger-like calli.

Description
The flowers are usually brilliant blue but vary from pale to dark blue. Flowering occurs from September to November. The flowers are insect pollinated and open on sunny days. This species is similar to T. cornicina but has a much broader leaf than that species.

Taxonomy and naming
Thelymitra crinita was first formally described in 1839 by John Lindley and the description was published in A Sketch of the Vegetation of the Swan River Colony. The specific epithet (crinita) is a Latin word meaning "hairy", referring to the crest on top of the column.

Distribution and habitat
The blue lady orchid grows in coastal and near-coastal forest, sometimes in swampy places and is found between Gingin and Esperance in the Esperance Plains, Geraldton Sandplains, Jarrah Forest, Swan Coastal Plain and Warren biogeographic regions growing on grey-white sand and loamy clay.

Conservation
This orchid is common in its range and is classified as "not threatened" by the Western Australian Government Department of Parks and Wildlife.

References

External links

crinita
Endemic orchids of Australia
Orchids of Western Australia
Plants described in 1839
Endemic flora of Western Australia